Austin Russell is an American entrepreneur, founder and CEO of Luminar Technologies. Luminar specializes in lidar and machine perception technologies, mainly used in autonomous cars. Luminar went public in December 2020, making him the world's youngest self-made billionaire at the age of 25.

Early life and education
Russell grew up in Newport Beach, California.
At age 15, Russell applied for his first patent for a ground water recycling system to reuse water from sprinklers. When he was 15, Russell's parents introduced him to laser entrepreneur Jason Eichenholz, who became Russell's mentor and later joined Luminar as co-founder and chief technology officer.

He graduated from St. Margaret's Episcopal School in 2013. He also studied at the Beckman Laser Institute at the University of California, Irvine while in high school. Russell has said that he often teaches himself new skills from Wikipedia articles and YouTube videos.

Luminar
Russell founded Luminar in 2012 while he was still in high school, shortly before turning 17. After graduating from high school, he attended Stanford University for three months, taking courses in applied physics. Russell won $100,000 from the Thiel Fellowship in 2013, leading him to drop out and focus on Luminar full-time.

The company spent its first five years in stealth mode. Rather than purchasing components, Russell engineered and manufactured Luminar's lidar components himself.

On December 3, 2020, Luminar went public, trading on the Nasdaq as LAZR. Russell's 104.7 million shares, roughly one third of Luminar's equity, were worth $2.4 billion at the close of trading on December 3, making Russell the world's youngest self-made billionaire. He also became chairman of the company at this time.

Philanthropy
On January 1, 2022, Russell donated $4 million to Team Seas, allowing the fundraiser to reach its goal of $30 million raised.

Recognition
In 2017, MIT Technology Review named Russell an "Innovator Under 35".
In 2018, Forbes named Russell to its "30 Under 30" list for founding and leading Luminar.
Russell appeared on the Fortune magazine 40 Under 40 list in 2021.
Motor Trend ranked Russell #41 on its 2022 Power List.

References

21st-century American businesspeople
American billionaires
American technology chief executives
American technology company founders
American industrial designers
People from Newport Beach, California
Thiel fellows

Living people
1995 births